This is a list of public artworks in the former Metropolitan Borough of Paddington in London, now a part of the City of Westminster.


Bayswater 

Bayswater is a largely residential district north-west of Charing Cross, bordering with the northern end of Kensington Gardens. Its essential character is now defined by the stuccoed terraces erected from 1827 onwards, which spread in a westerly direction over the course of the 19th century.

Maida Vale 

Maida Vale is an area of residential terraces and mansion blocks, defined at its southern end by the Regent's and Grand Union Canals.

Paddington 

Paddington is the area west of Marylebone, in the postal district W2. Much of the recent public art in the area is connected to the Paddington Waterside developments.

References

Paddington
Paddington